The men's competition in the light-heavyweight (– 85 kg) division was staged on November 26, 2009.

Schedule

Medalists

Records

 Andrei Rybakou's world record was rescinded in 2016.

Results

References
Results 

- Mens 85 kg, 2009 World Weightlifting Championships